The grapheme Čč (Latin C with caron, also known as háček in Czech, mäkčeň in Slovak, kvačica in Serbo-Croatian, and strešica in Slovene) is used in various contexts, usually denoting the voiceless postalveolar affricate consonant  like the English ch in the word chocolate. It is represented in Unicode as U+010C (uppercase Č) and U+010D (lowercase č).

Origin
The symbol originates with the 15th-century Czech alphabet as introduced by the reforms of Jan Hus. In 1830, it was adopted into Gaj's Latin alphabet, which is used in Serbo-Croatian. It is also used in Macedonian, Slovak, Slovenian, Latvian, Lithuanian, Pomak, and Berber alphabets.

Uses

In Berber, Slovenian,
Serbo-Croatian,
Sorbian, Skolt Sami, and Lakota alphabets, it is the fourth letter of the alphabet. In Czech, Northern Sami alphabet, Belarusian, and the Baltic languages Lithuanian and Latvian, the letter is in fifth place. In Slovak it is sixth letter of the alphabet. It is also used in Pashto (equivalent to چ), romanization of Syriac and Saanich.

It is equivalent to Ч in Cyrillic and can be used in Ukrainian, Belarusian, Russian, Serbian, and Bulgarian romanisations. It features more prominently in the Latin alphabets or transliterations of Serbo-Croatian and Macedonian. The letter Č can also be substituted by Ç in the transliterations of Turkic languages, either using the Latin script or the Cyrillic script.

/Č/ is also used in Americanist phonetic notation.

Č is the similar to the Sanskrit च (a palatal sound, although IAST uses the letter c to denote it)

Software

Representation in software follows the same rules as the háček.

Unicode

U+010C (uppercase Č—use Alt 268 for input) and U+010D (lowercase č—use Alt 269 for input) create this character.  The combining character U+030C can be placed together with either c or C to generally achieve the same visual result.

TeX/LaTeX

In text the control sequence \v{c} will work.  In math mode, $\check{c}$ also works.

See also

 Ć
 Cz (digraph)
 Ch (digraph)

References

Latin letters with diacritics
Phonetic transcription symbols
Lithuanian language
Croatian language
Serbian language